Callirhoé is an opera by the French composer André Cardinal Destouches. It takes the form of a tragédie en musique in a prologue and five acts. The libretto, by Pierre-Charles Roy, is based on a story from The Description of Greece by Pausanias (see Coresus). The opera was first performed on December 27, 1712, by the Académie royale de musique at the Théâtre du Palais-Royal in Paris. Destouches reworked the score for a revival on 22 October, 1743. This version ends abruptly with the death of Corésus.

Roles

Synopsis

Following the revised version of 1743.

Act One
Princess Callirhoé, heiress to the kingdom of Calydon, laments her fate. Her parents are forcing her to marry a man she loathes, Corésus, the high priest of Bacchus, when she is really in love with Agénor. The wedding ceremony of Corésus and Callirhoé is interrupted when the latter faints at the altar.

Act Two
Agénor declares his love for Callirhoé but the couple are surprised by the furious Corésus. Corésus calls on the priests of Bacchus and the people of Calydon to kill Agénor.

Act Three
Eager to put an end to the disturbances, Callirhoé's mother takes her daughter to consult the oracle of Pan. The god delivers his sentence: the blood of Callirhoé must be spilt or that of someone in love with her.

Act Four
Callirhoé is resigned to sacrifice herself for the good of the kingdom. But the people protest against the oracle and Agénor declares he is ready to die himself to save his beloved.

Act Five
Alone in the temple, Corésus ponders what action to take. If Agénor is sacrificed, then he will win Callirhoé but she will hate him for evermore. As Agénor and Callirhoé enter the temple, both eager to sacrifice themselves to save the other, Corésus stabs himself to death. The oracle is fulfilled: the blood of a man in love with Callirhoé has been spilt.

Recordings
 Callirhoé, (1743 version, without prologue), Stéphanie d'Oustrac, Callirhoé, Cyril Auvity, Agénor, João Fernandes, Corésus, Ingrid Perruche, La Reine, Renaud Delaigue, Le Ministre, Stéphanie Révidat, Une Princesse de Calypso, Une Bergère, Le Concert Spirituel, conducted by Hervé Niquet. 2 CD Glossa 2007.

Sources
 Original libretto: Callirhoé, Tragédie représentée pour la première fois par l'Académie Royale de Musique, Le Mardy vingt-septiéme Decembre 1712, Paris Ballard, 1712 (accessible for free online in gallica, Bibliothèque Nationale de France)
 Original printed score: Callirhoé, Tragedie en Musique, par Monsieur Destouches, Inspecteur General de l'Academie Royale de Musique; Représentée pour la première fois par la mème Academie, le vingt-septiéme Decembre 1712, Paris, Ballard, 1712 (accessible for free online at IMSLP)
 The Viking Opera Guide ed. Holden (Viking, 1993)
 Le magazine de l'opéra baroque by Jean-Claude Brenac
 
 Booklet notes to the above recording.

French-language operas
Tragédies en musique
1712 operas
Operas by André Cardinal Destouches
Operas
Opera world premieres at the Paris Opera
Operas based on classical mythology